Tabernaemontana thurstonii is a species of plant in the family Apocynaceae. It is endemic to Fiji.

References

Endemic flora of Fiji
thurstonii
Least concern plants
Taxonomy articles created by Polbot
Taxa named by John Gilbert Baker
Taxa named by John Horne (botanist)